Ewa Monika Mes (born 6 May 1951) is a Polish politician who is current a Voivode of Kuyavian-Pomeranian Voivodeship.
 
Ewa Mes was worked in the Kuyavian-Pomeranian Marshal Office in the Department of Agriculture and later as a Director of UM delegation in Bydgoszcz.

When in the 2010 local elections, Dariusz Kurzawa (Vicevoivode) was elected to the Kuyavian-Pomeranian Regional Assembly, she was a potential candidate for new Vicevoivode. Incumbent Voivode, Rafał Bruski was elected as a President of Bydgoszcz. After that, PO-PSL government coalition decided that the voivode will be from the PSL, and representative of the PO will be vicevoivod. She was nominated as a Voivode on 14 December 2010. Mes is first woman who served this office (Marzenna Drab was acting voivode in 2006).

On 12 December 2011, she was renominated in the Second Cabinet of Donald Tusk.

See also
 Kuyavian-Pomeranian Voivodeship
 Greater Poland Voivodeship

References

External links
  Kuyavian-Pomeranian Voivodeship Office webside

1951 births
Living people

Voivodes of Kuyavian-Pomeranian Voivodeship
Kazimierz Wielki University in Bydgoszcz alumni